The 2006 Time Warner Cable Road Runner 225 was the fourth round of the 2006 Bridgestone Presents the Champ Car World Series Powered by Ford season, held on June 4, 2006, on the Milwaukee Mile oval in West Allis, Wisconsin.  Sébastien Bourdais took the pole and the win, his fourth consecutive victory to open the year.  It was the final CART/Champ Car event to take place on an oval.

Qualifying results

Race

* Mario Domínguez was stripped of his points for this race for avoidable contact during the first lap of the race.  He was also put on probation for the next three events.
† The car of Alex Tagliani was withdrawn from the event after heavy contact with the wall damaged his car beyond repair during the first practice period.

Caution flags

Notes

 New Race Record Sébastien Bourdais 1:45:03.946
 Average Speed 116.101 mph
 This was the final time that powerhouse team Newman/Haas Racing locked out the front row in Champ Car competition. However, both cars would brace the front row for the IRL-sanctioned 2009 RoadRunner Turbo Indy 300.

Championship standings after the race

Drivers' Championship standings

 Note: Only the top five positions are included.

References

External links
 Qualifying Results 
 Team Australia withdraws Tagliani 
 Race Results
 Milwaukee Race Penalties Announced 

Milwaukee
Time Warner Cable Road Runner 225
Milwaukee Indy 225